The 2006 FESPIC Games, officially known as the 9th and Final FESPIC Games, was an Asia-Pacific disabled multi-sport event held in Kuala Lumpur, Malaysia, from 25 November to 1 December 2006. This was the first and last time Malaysia hosted the games. Malaysia is the eighth and the last FESPIC organisation member to host the FESPIC games after Japan, Australia, Hong Kong, Indonesia, China, Thailand, and South Korea. Around 3,641 athletes from 46 nations competed at the games which featured 19 sports. The games was opened by Prime Minister of Malaysia, Abdullah Ahmad Badawi at the KLFA stadium.

The final medal tally was led by China, followed by Thailand, South Korea, and host Malaysia. After the closing ceremony, FESPIC Federation was officially dissolved and its members were absorbed by 2 areas of the IPC: Asia and Oceania, with the event succeeded by the Asian Para Games.

Host city
Malaysia, New Zealand and Hong Kong submitted their bids to the FESPIC Federation to host the games in 1999 and present them at the
FESPIC Executive Committee Meeting in January 2000 in Seoul, South Korea. However, both New Zealand and Hong Kong later voluntarily withdrawn their bids after sometime and Kuala Lumpur was chosen as the games host city.

Development and preparation
The KL'06 9th FESPIC Games Organising Committee was formed to oversee the staging of the games.

Venues
The Final FESPIC Games had 20 venues for the games. 11 in Kuala Lumpur, 7 in Selangor and two stand-alone venues in Putrajaya and Negeri Sembilan respectively.

Symbols

The 2006 FESPIC Games logo is a heart-shape image which represents the spirit, passion and tradition of the FESPIC Games. The initial KL in the logo, represents Kuala Lumpur, the capital city of Malaysia as the venue of the Games, and the '06 represents to the year 2006. The official mascot of the 2006 FESPIC Games is a pair of mousedeer named "Ujang", the male one and its female counterpart, "Cek Mek". The adoption of mousedeer as the games' mascot is to represent the courage of the Paralympic athletes in overcoming challenges and the odds. The names of the mascots, Ujang and Che Mek, are common nicknames for local Malay youths.

The games

Opening and closing ceremonies
The opening ceremony was held on 25 November 2006 at the KLFA Stadium. The ceremony begins with the marching of the Malaysian Armed Forces along with the mascots of the games. This was followed by the firework display and the marching of the contingents of the participating nations. Abdullah Ahmad Badawi, then Prime minister of Malaysia, declared the games opened. Lee Seng Chow, the blind discus throw athlete then take the oath on behalf of the athletes. Finally the torch was lit by four Malaysian paralympic athletes, Razali Jaafar, Hisham Khaironi, Choo Kam Chan and David Wang.

Meanwhile, the closing ceremony was held on 1 December 2006 at the KLFA Stadium.

Sports

  Archery
  Athletics
  Powerlifting
  Bowling
  Boccia
  Cycling
  Wheelchair fencing
  Football 7-a-side
  Judo
  Lawn bowls
  Sailing
  Shooting
  Swimming
  Badminton
  Ten-pin bowling
  Sitting volleyball
  Table tennis
  Wheelchair basketball
  Wheelchair tennis

Medal table
A total of 1476 medals, comprising 542 Gold medals, 476 Silver medals, 458 Bronze medals were awarded to athletes. The host Malaysia's performance was their best ever yet and was placed fourth overall amongst participating nations.

References

External links
 2006 FESPIC Games - official website 

Asian Para Games
FESPIC Games
FESPIC Games
FESPIC
Multi-sport events in Malaysia
International sports competitions hosted by Malaysia
Sport in Kuala Lumpur
2000s in Kuala Lumpur
FESPIC Games